Carl August Buchholz (13 August 1796 – 7 August 1884) was a German organ builder.

Life 
Born in Berlin, Buchholz learned the organ builder's trade from his father Johann Simon Buchholz. He built his own first new organ in 1817 for the Prenzlau Sabinenkirche. From 1821 onwards, he was in charge of building organs with his father. The workshop was located in Kleine Hamburger Straße/corner of Auguststraße in Berlin-Mitte. His father gave him the opportunity to try out technical innovations in organ building.

Buchholz had been married to Christiane Wilhelmine Kunsemüller, the daughter of a doctor from Wittstock, since 9 September 1820. His son Carl Friedrich Buchholz (7 July 1821 in Berlin – 17 February 1885 idem) first learned from his father and worked as a journeyman for Aristide Cavaillé-Coll in Paris around 1847/48. From 1848, he worked again for his father.

Buchholz was appointed "Academic Artist" in 1853 by the Academy of Arts (or the Prussian government ?).

After his death in 1884, his son Carl Friedrich Buchholz continued to run the workshop for a short time and died himself about six months later.

Organ building 
Buchholz built exclusively mechanical organs with slider chests.
Characteristic of his construction method were wedge-shaped cut sliders, which were pressed into wedge-shaped slider bands. This made it possible to compensate for changes in the wood caused by climatic conditions, for example in humid regions. Buchholz also introduced barque valves and swells as an innovation. The action was made with waveboards, modelled on those of Joachim Wagner and Ernst Julius Marx. Some of the smaller organs were built with side-playing wave frames.

Buchholz usually had architects such as Karl Friedrich Schinkel design the fronts for larger organs. For smaller instruments, he designed the models himself. The facade design shows an astonishing variety. Buchholz collaborated with organists such as August Wilhelm Bach and Carl August Haupt in the design of the stoplist. In some of the larger organs, there are striking similarities between the dispositions in the main and Oberwerk and Joachim Wagner's organ in Berlin's Marienkirche, which Buchholz had restored in 1829.

Buchhol is considered the most important organ builder in the Mark Brandenburg in his time. His method of construction was characterised by the highest precision in craftsmanship. Buchholz was very modest and largely refrained from excessive self-promotion.

Students 
Buchholz influenced a number of young organ builders who went on to work independently in various regions.

 Carl Friedrich Buchholz, his son
 Moritz Baumgarten, afterwards organ builder in Zahna
 Wilhelm Bergen, afterwards organ builder in Halberstadt
 Ferdinand Dinse, afterwards organ builder in Berlin
 Friedrich Friese III, afterwards important organ builder in Schwerin, Mecklenburg
 Barnim Grüneberg, his nephew, afterwards important organ builder in Stettin, Pomerania
 Ernst Hildebrand
 Johannes Kewitsch, from Berlin
 Friedrich Kienscherf, afterwards organ builder in Eberswalde
 Wilhelm Lang, afterwards organ builder in Berlin
 Ferdinand Lange, afterwards instrument maker in Berlin
 Friedrich Hermann Lütkemüller, afterwards important organ builder in Wittstock, Prignitz
 Wilhelm Meywald, afterwards organ builder in Transylvania
 Johann Rohn, afterwards organ builder in Wormditt, East Prussia
 Carl Schneider, afterwards organ builder in Kronstadt, Transylvania
 Christian Friedrich Voelkner, afterwards organ builder in Dünnow, Hinterpommern

Work 
Buchholz built a total of 140 new organs between 1817 and his death in 1884. In addition, there were 20 rebuilds and restorations. All of Buchholz's organs have purely mechanical slider chests with the wedge loops he invented.

Among Buchholz's most important works is the organ built in 1839 in the Transylvanian Kronstadt in the Protestant Biserica Neagră: with 63 stops on four manuals, the Buchholz Organ of the Black Church is the largest instrument built by Buchholz and still survives today.

In 1821, he still completed the organ in the Barther Marienkirche together with his father. This organ was almost revolutionary for its time, with a 42-voice disposition distributed over two manuals and pedal and a manual range up to the three-stroke G. It is today the Buchholz organ. Today it is the Buchholz organ with the largest original inventory in Germany. The early romantic organ is of European significance.

The largest Buchholz organ in Germany is in the Nikolaikirche (see Organ of the St. Nikolaikirche) and dates from 1841.

List of realisations

New buildings 
The size of the instruments is indicated in the fifth column by the number of manuals and the number of sounding stops in the sixth column. A capital "P" stands for an independent pedal, a small "p" for an attached pedal. The last column contains information on the original and present condition. Italicisation indicates that the organ in question is no longer preserved or that only the casing is preserved.

With Johann Simon Buchholz 
Buchholz built the organs listed below between 1812 and 1825 together with his father Johann Simon.

Own new buildings 
From 1817 to 1847 he built alone the following organs.

As Carl August Buchholz & Sohn 
From around 1866, the company operated under the name Carl August Buchholz & Sohn.

Conversions and repairs

References

Further reading 
 
 
 
 
 
 
 
 Uwe Pape, Wolfram Hackel, Christhard Kirchner (ed.): Lexikon norddeutscher Orgelbauer. Vol. 4. Berlin, Brandenburg und Umgebung einschließlich Mecklenburg-Vorpommern. Pape Verlag, Berlin 2017, .

External links 
 
 
 Orgellandschaft Brandenburg

German pipe organ builders
1796 births
1884 deaths
People from Berlin